National Tertiary Route 911, or just Route 911 (or ) is a National Road Route of Costa Rica, located in the Guanacaste province.

Description
In Guanacaste province the route covers Santa Cruz canton (Tempate, Cabo Velas districts), Carrillo canton (Sardinal district).

References

Highways in Costa Rica